Tamás Mónos (born 3 January 1968) is a retired Hungarian football midfielder.

References

1968 births
Living people
Hungarian footballers
Veszprém LC footballers
Beerschot A.C. players
RFC Liège players
Vasas SC players
Association football midfielders
Hungarian expatriate footballers
Expatriate footballers in Belgium
Hungarian expatriate sportspeople in Belgium
Hungary international footballers